Bussotti is an Italian surname. Notable people with the surname include:

Asfò Bussotti (born 1925), Italian long distance runner
Joao Bussotti (born 1993), Mozambican-born Italian middle-distance runner
Sylvano Bussotti (1931–2021), Italian composer of contemporary music

See also
 Bussetti (surname)